Every Generation is the fifth studio album by American saxophonist Ronnie Laws released in 1980 by United Artists Records. The album reached No. 4 on the Billboard Top Soul Albums chart.

Singles
The album's title track reached No. 12 on the Billboard Hot Soul Songs chart.

Tracklisting

References

1980 albums
United Artists Records albums